The Ministry of Transportation and Communications (MOTC) is a cabinet-level governmental body of the Republic of China (Taiwan), in charge of all policy and regulation of transportation and communications networks and administration of all transportation and communications operations and enterprises in Taiwan.

Introduction

In Taiwan, transportation and communications operations comprise four categories: communications, transportation, meteorology, and tourism. The Ministry of Transportation and Communications is responsible for making policy, formulating laws and regulations, and overseeing operations in the area of transportation and communications.

Communications operations encompass postal services and telecommunications. Postal services are managed by the Chunghwa Post. Regarding telecommunications, the MOTC is responsible for the overall planning of communications resources, assisting and promoting the communications industry, and fostering universal access to communications.

Transportation operations are divided into land, sea, and air transportation.

Land transportation comprises railways (including conventional railways, mass rapid transit, and high-speed rail) as well as highway transportation. Conventional railways is operated by the Taiwan Railways Administration. Mass rapid transit systems are managed by local governments. High-speed rail is managed by the Taiwan High Speed Rail. Highway transportation is managed by the Directorate General of Highways. Expressways are constructed and maintained by the Freeway Bureau.

Sea transportation consists of water transport and harbors. Shipping carriers of water transport are privately operated, while harbors are operated by the Taiwan International Ports Corporation.

Air transportation includes airline companies and airports. Airline companies are privately operated, while airports and flight navigation services are operated by the Civil Aeronautics Administration.

The Central Weather Bureau under this ministry handles all national meteorological operations.

The Tourism Bureau under this ministry provides planning and oversight for tourism development.

Organization

The administrators of MOTC include the Minister, Executive Vice Minister, and two Administrative Deputy Ministers.

MOTC is divided into an Internal Division and an External Division.

Internal Division
Secretariat, Office of Technical Superintendents, Office of Counselors, Department of General Affairs, Department of Personnel, Department of Civil Service Ethics, Department of Accounting, Department of Statistics, Legal Affairs Committee, Petition Reviewing Committee, Road Traffic Safety Committee, Office of Science and Technology Advisors, Information Management Center, Transportation Mobilization Committee, Department of Railways and Highways, Department of Posts and Telecommunications, Department of Navigation and Aviation, Transportation and Communications Management Unit.

Administrative Agencies
 Freeway Bureau
 Civil Aeronautics Administration
 Tourism Bureau
 Directorate General of Highways
 Central Weather Bureau
 Railway Bureau
 Maritime and Port Bureau
 Institute of Transportation

Government corporations
 Chunghwa Post Co., Ltd.
 Taiwan Railways Administration
 Taoyuan International Airport Corporation
 Taiwan International Ports Corporation

List of Ministers

Political Party:

In the latter half of the 20th century, the ministry was created by merging the separate ministries of Transportation (c. 1912), Communications (c. 1938), and Railways (c. 1928 replacing the earlier iteration of the Ministry of Communications and links to the Ministry of Posts and Communications of Imperial China).

 Sun Fo Minister of Communications (1926 - 1927), Minister of Railways (1928-1931)
 Wang Boqun (1927 – 1931)
 Chen Mingshu Minister of Communications (December 1931 – October 1932)
 Huang Shaohong (July 1932 – December 1935)
 Chu Chia-hua Minister of Communications, Minister of Transportation (October 1932 – December 1935)
 Yu Feipeng (1935) (acting)
 Ku Meng-yu Minister of Railways (1932 - 1935), Minister of Transportation (1935 – 1937)
 Yu Feipeng (March 1937 – 1938)
 Chang Kia-ngau Minister of Railways (1935 -1938), Minister of Communications (1938 – 1942)
 Zeng Yangfu (December 1942 – February 1945)
 Yu Feipeng (February 1945 – May 1946)
 Yu Dawei (May 1946 - May 1948)

Access
The MOTC building is accessible by walking distance North West of Dongmen Station of the Taipei Metro on the Red Line.

See also 

 Transportation in Taiwan
 Ministry of Transport of the People's Republic of China

References

External links 

 Ministry of Transportation and Communications 

1912 establishments in China
Transportation and Communications
Taiwan
Taiwan
Transportation organizations based in Taiwan
Ministries established in 1912